Reche Summit, at an elevation of 3,016 feet, the tallest peak of the range of mountains trending northwest to southeast south of Reche Canyon, in Riverside County, California.  These include Blue Mountain to its northwest and to the southeast, Olive Summit and the Kalmia Hills.

References

Mountains of Riverside County, California
Mountains of Southern California